In enzymology, a saccharopine dehydrogenase (NADP+, L-lysine-forming) is an enzyme that catalyzes the chemical reaction

N6-(L-1,3-dicarboxypropyl)-L-lysine + NADP+ + H2O  L-lysine + 2-oxoglutarate + NADPH + H+

The 3 substrates of this enzyme are N6-(L-1,3-dicarboxypropyl)-L-lysine, NADP+, and H2O, whereas its 4 products are L-lysine, 2-oxoglutarate, NADPH, and H+.

This enzyme belongs to the family of oxidoreductases, specifically those acting on the CH-NH group of donors with NAD+ or NADP+ as acceptor.  The systematic name of this enzyme class is N6-(L-1,3-dicarboxypropyl)-L-lysine:NADP+ oxidoreductase (L-lysine-forming). Other names in common use include lysine-2-oxoglutarate reductase, lysine-ketoglutarate reductase, L-lysine-alpha-ketoglutarate reductase, lysine:alpha-ketoglutarate:TPNH oxidoreductase, (epsilon-N-[gultaryl-2]-L-lysine forming), saccharopine (nicotinamide adenine dinucleotide phosphate,, lysine-forming) dehydrogenase, 6-N-(L-1,3-dicarboxypropyl)-L-lysine:NADP+ oxidoreductase, and (L-lysine-forming).  This enzyme participates in lysine biosynthesis and lysine degradation.

References

 
 

EC 1.5.1
NADPH-dependent enzymes
Enzymes of unknown structure